David Dederer (born October 5, 1964) is an American guitarist and singer.  He was a member of the alternative rock band The Presidents of the United States of America. An alumnus of Seattle, Washington's The Bush School and Brown University in Providence, Rhode Island, he founded The Presidents with fellow Bush School alumnus Chris Ballew. He has also been a member of The Gentlemen and Loaded with Guns N' Roses bassist Duff McKagan, also a Seattle native, and Subset, a collaboration between The Presidents and Sir Mix-a-Lot.

Dederer currently heads programming and editorial at Amazon Music and manages The Presidents' ongoing business interests.

Dederer worked for Seattle web/mobile media company Melodeo from 2007 to 2010 as Vice President, Business Development.  Melodeo was acquired by Hewlett Packard in June 2010.  He previously worked for four years as a public affairs consultant at Seattle firm Pyramid Communications.

Prior to The Presidents' success, Dederer taught high school English at Kent Denver School and The Bush School, did public relations work on environmental issues, and attended graduate school in urban planning at the University of Washington. He has 2 daughters who play in the critically acclaimed Jazz Ensemble 1 at Bellevue High School.

Dederer is the older brother of writer Claire Dederer.

References

External links 
Dave Dederer on reddit
The Melodeo Team

1964 births
Living people
Musicians from Seattle
American rock singers
American rock guitarists
American male guitarists
The Presidents of the United States of America (band) members
Loaded (band) members
The Minus 5 members
20th-century American guitarists
20th-century American male musicians
Kent Denver School alumni
University of Washington College of Built Environments alumni
Brown University alumni